

Classification 

The winning roster of Olimpija:
  Marjan Kandus
  Boris Kristančič
  Ivo Daneu
  Janez Škrjanc
  Matija Dermastija
  Miha Lokar
  Bogo Debevc
  Primož Brišnik
  Sašo Poljšak
  Peter Kralj

Coach:  Boris Kristančič

Scoring leaders
 Radivoj Korać (BSK) – ___ points (29.1 ppg)
 ???
 ???

Qualification in 1958 season European competitions 

FIBA European Champions Cup
 Olimpija (champions)

References

Yugoslav First Basketball League seasons